Marecidia is a genus of moths in the subfamily Arctiinae.

Species
 Marecidia achrysa Forbes, 1939
 Marecidia sanguipuncta Schaus, 1901

References

Natural History Museum Lepidoptera generic names catalog

Arctiinae